John Fitzgerald Blake (March 6, 1961 – July 23, 2020) was an American college and professional football coach. He played college football as a nose guard for the Oklahoma Sooners. He served as the head coach of the Sooners from 1996 to 1998.

Coaching career
Blake served as the head coach for the Oklahoma Sooners from 1996 to 1998, succeeding the one-year term of Howard Schnellenberger. He compiled a career record of 12–22, which is the worst three-year stretch at the University of Oklahoma football history. Despite his overall record as college head coach, Blake was a great recruiter, bringing in more than half of the 2000 championship team's 22 starters, including future NFL players like safety  Roy Williams and linebacker Rocky Calmus.

Prior to his arrival in Norman, Blake had served as the defensive line coach for the Dallas Cowboys, working alongside future UNC coach Butch Davis (2007–11) as well as former Sooner and then Cowboys head coach Barry Switzer.  The Dallas Cowboys won two Super Bowls (1993 & 1995) during Blake's stint.  Blake also worked as a defensive assistant at Oklahoma in the early 1990s under Gary Gibbs.

Blake served as the defensive line coach at Mississippi State University in 2003. He later held the same position on Bill Callahan's staff at the University of Nebraska from 2004 to 2006. Blake resigned his position at the University of North Carolina at Chapel Hill on Sunday, September 5, 2010.  On February 16, 2016 Lamar University announced that they had hired Blake to serve as their defensive line coach.  After one month at Lamar and during the Cardinals' spring camp, Blake accepted the defensive line coach position with the Buffalo Bills on March 15, 2016 following the Bills' firing of Karl Dunbar.

Controversies
Blake was involved in a controversy towards the end of his tenure as defense line coach for the Dallas Cowboys. According to The New York Times, Blake made claims to head coach Barry Switzer that Hall of Fame quarterback Troy Aikman treated his black teammates differently and was a racist. In response to this, many members of the Cowboys organization, including black coaches and players, came to the defense of the quarterback. Michael Irvin, Emmitt Smith, and Charles Haley went on the record to stand by Aikman. Aikman also asked a number of black players, including Deion Sanders and Darren Woodson, if there was a problem, and they said there wasn't one. Blake was dismissed from his position with the Cowboys to begin serving as head coach at Oklahoma.

In 2010, Blake resigned from North Carolina in the midst of an investigation into players' relationships with agent Gary Wichard, who died of pancreatic cancer in 2011. At the time, Blake was suspected of being an employee and receiving cash benefits from Wichard. Blake denied all allegations, and said he was secretive about his communications with Wichard because he did not want to reveal his friend's then-secret cancer diagnosis. On March 12, 2012, the NCAA announced that Blake had received a three-year show-cause penalty, which effectively barred him from college coaching during that period. The NCAA determined that Blake had received personal loans from Wichard and failed to disclose them to UNC, and also misled NCAA investigators.

Death 
Blake died on the morning of July 23, 2020 at the age of 59. He suffered a heart attack while walking near his home and was transported to Baylor University Medical Center where he was pronounced dead.

Head coaching record

References
General

Specific

1961 births
2020 deaths
Dallas Cowboys coaches
Lamar Cardinals football coaches
Mississippi State Bulldogs football coaches
NCAA sanctions
Nebraska Cornhuskers football coaches
North Carolina Tar Heels football coaches
Oklahoma Sooners football coaches
Oklahoma Sooners football players
Tulsa Golden Hurricane football coaches
Sportspeople from Rockford, Illinois
Coaches of American football from Illinois
Players of American football from Illinois